The 2015–16 California Golden Bears men's basketball team represented the University of California, Berkeley in the 2015–16 NCAA Division I men's basketball season. This was Cuonzo Martin's second year as head coach at California. The Golden Bears played their home games at Haas Pavilion as members of the Pac-12 Conference. They finished the season 23–11, 12–6 in Pac-12 play to finish in a tie for third place. They defeated Oregon State in the quarterfinals of the Pac-12 tournament to advance to the semifinals where they lost to Utah. They received an at-large bid to the NCAA tournament where they lost in the first round to Hawaii.

Previous season
The 2014–15 Cal Golden Bears finished the season with an overall record of 18–15, and 7–11 in conference play. They finished in eighth place in the conference and entered the Pac-12 tournament winning their first-round game against Washington State before losing in the quarterfinals to Arizona.

Off-season

Departures

2015 recruiting class

Roster

Schedule

|-
!colspan=12 style="background:#; color:#;"| Tour of Australia

|-
!colspan=12 style="background:#; color:#;"| Exhibition

|-
!colspan=11 style="background:#; color:#;"| Non-conference regular season

|-
!colspan=12 style="background:#;"| Pac-12 regular season

|-
!colspan=12 style="background:#;"| Pac-12 tournament

|-
!colspan=12 style="background:#;"| NCAA tournament

Ranking movement

See also
2015–16 California Golden Bears women's basketball team

References

California
California Golden Bears men's basketball seasons
California
California Golden
California Golden